Suresh K Reddy is an Indian diplomat and current Ambassador of India to Brazil. He previously served as ambassador to ASEAN, Iraq, G20, G7, and BRICS. Ambassador Reddy assumed charge as the Ambassador of India to the Federative Republic of Brazil on 13 September 2020, upon arrival in Brasilia.

Indian Ambassador to Brazil
Ambassador Reddy assumed charge as the Ambassador of India to the Federative Republic of Brazil on 13 September 2020, upon arrival in Brasilia. He is loved by the Indian community in Brazil for his regular online meetings with the diaspora where he not only answers any concerns of the Indian subjects but also takes their suggestions to improve the India-Brazil relations.

Personal life

Ambassador Reddy is married and has 2 children.

See also
Brazil-India relations
List of diplomatic missions of India

References

External links
 Ambassador´s Profile, Official page at Embassy of India, Brasilia
 Suresh Reddy on Twitter

Ambassadors of India to Brazil
Living people
Year of birth missing (living people)